The Hunslet Grange Flats (colliqually known as the Leek Street Flats) was a complex of deck-accessed flats in Hunslet, Leeds.

Planning and construction
Slum clearances in the 1960s led to clearing of much of Hunslet with many terraced housing, mostly back-to-backs.  Deck accessed flats were becoming a common solution in cities around this time.  Leeds had one development of medium rise large scale flats, which were built in Quarry Hill in the 1930s, however they were more conventional in their enclosed design.

Construction of the complex of 350 flats and maisonettes began in 1968  The complex was commissioned by Leeds City Council and built by Shepherd Construction.  The building was built of pre-fabricated concrete panels and constructed using temporary cranes built on site which ran on rails across the footprints of where the buildings were to be built.

Design
The complex was built in the style of so-called 'streets in the sky' with overhead walkways connecting blocks.  The exterior of the buildings were pale grey pebbledashed concrete panels.  Each floor had a rubbish disposal chute leading to huge bins at street level. Shops and a public house, 'The Pioneer' made up part of the complex.  Twelve of the blocks were six storeys in height and six were of seven, with the entrance on the second floor.  The estate covered a large area of Hunslet and was arranged in three clusters around a small park.  The individual flats had large windows running the length of the exterior walls providing the flats with ample natural light.  A perimeter road was constructed which remains largely intact as 'The Oval', there was limited vehicular access within this road.

Reception and social problems
The complex was at first popular with its tenants. However, this early popularity was short-lived.  The warm-air heating systems were inadequate for the poorly insulated concrete prefabricated buildings, the interiors suffered from condensation and the exterior walls became streaked with black.  The decks were poorly drained and could become flooded in heavy rain.  Over time the concrete panels weathered and the rebar became visible.  In addition, the 'rabbit-warren' like layout of interconnecting blocks made the estate hard to navigate and police, reduced resident surveillance and provided a haven for surreptitious criminal activity.  Burglary, delinquency and violent crime became commonplace while the complex's precincts were used for the abandonment of vehicles.  The complex gained a reputation for crime and delinquency and the pub gained a reputation of its own.

Demolition
Demolition of the complex started in 1983, less than fifteen years after the first tenants moved in.  Demolition was undertaken by mechanical means.  All other complexes constructed by Yorkshire Development Group were also demolished in the 1980s.

Site today

Today the site consists of low-rise housing, the Hunslet Green Community Sports Club, a small business park and a small Lidl supermarket.  The only remaining part is an electrical substation which remains on the Oval.

Similar examples
While there are many complexes of similar layout and concept, the Bransholme Maisonettes in Bransholme, Kingston upon Hull were similar in design and aesthetics.  They were demolished in the late 1980s having suffered similar problems to Hunslet Grange.  Like Hunslet Grange these were also designed by Yorkshire Development Group.  The Broomhall flats in Broomhill were also constructed by YDG but were somewhat different aesthetically.

See also
Hulme Crescents
Park Hill, Sheffield
Robin Hood Gardens

References

External links
 Video showing the construction of the complex
 Video showing the complex in its early years
 Video showing the site in 1983

Buildings and structures demolished in 1983
Places in Leeds
1983 disestablishments in England